The Back Room may refer to:

Emo's, formerly known as The Back Room, a music and event venue located in Austin, Texas
The Back Room (album), a 2005 album by Editors